Bitlis District (also: Merkez, meaning "central") is a district of Bitlis Province of Turkey. Its seat is the city Bitlis. Its area is 1,064 km2, and its population is 71,077 (2021).

Composition
There are two municipalities in Bitlis District:
 Bitlis
 Yolalan

There are 77 villages in Bitlis District:

 Ağaçdere
 Ağaçköprü
 Ağaçpınar
 Akçalı
 Alaniçi
 Arıdağ
 Aşağıbalcılar
 Aşağıkaraboy
 Aşağıölek
 Aşağıyolak
 Ayrancılar
 Başhan
 Başmaklı
 Bayramalan
 Beşkaynak
 Bölükyazı
 Çalıdüzü
 Çayırbaşı
 Çeltikli
 Çobansuyu
 Cumhuriyet
 Değirmenaltı
 Deliktaş
 Dereağzı
 Dikme
 Direktaşı
 Doğruyol
 Dörtağaç
 Döşkaya
 Ekinli
 Esenburun
 Geçitbaşı
 İçgeçit
 İçmeli
 Ilıcak
 Karbastı
 Karınca
 Kavakdibi
 Kayabaşı
 Kayadağ
 Kayalıbağ
 Keklikdüzü
 Kınalı
 Kireçtaşı
 Kokarsu
 Kömüryakan
 Konalga
 Konuksayar
 Koruk
 Küllüce
 Narlıdere
 Oğulcak
 Ortakapı
 Sarıkonak
 Sarpkaya
 Tabanözü
 Tanrıyar
 Tatlıkaynak
 Tınar
 Uçankuş
 Üçevler
 Ünaldı
 Yanlızçamlar
 Yarönü
 Yayalar
 Yaygın
 Yeşilsırt
 Yolağzı
 Yolcular
 Yolyazı
 Yücebaş
 Yukarıbalcılar
 Yukarıkaraboy
 Yukarıölek
 Yukarıyolak
 Yumurtatepe
 Yuvacık

References

Districts of Bitlis Province